Portneuf  may refer to:

Canada
 Portneuf Regional County Municipality, Quebec
 Portneuf, Quebec, a town in the Portneuf Regional County Municipality
 Portneuf (provincial electoral district), in Quebec
 Portneuf—Jacques-Cartier, a federal electoral district in Quebec, formerly known as Portneuf
 Portneuf-sur-Mer, Quebec, a town in the La Haute-Côte-Nord RCM, Quebec
 Saint-Léonard-de-Portneuf, Quebec, a municipality

United States
 Portneuf, Idaho, unincorporated communitiy in Bannock County, Idaho
 Portneuf River (Idaho), tributary of the Snake River
 Portneuf Wildlife Management Area, Bannock County, near the town of McCammon